Garnock Viaduct is a viaduct located to the north of Kilwinning in Scotland that crosses the River Garnock. It was completed in 1888 by the Lanarkshire and Ayrshire Railway. The line that it carried closed in 1953. It has since become part of National Cycle Route 7.

The bridge was constructed by Sir Robert McAlpine with stone from their nearby Auchenmeade quarry.

References 

Bridges completed in 1888
Kilwinning
Viaducts in Scotland
1888 establishments in Scotland